The 2013 Louisville Cardinals baseball team represented the University of Louisville in the 2013 NCAA Division I baseball season.  The Cardinals were coached by Dan McDonnell, in his seventh season, and played their home games at Jim Patterson Stadium.

The Cardinals finished with 51 wins, the most in school history, against 14 losses overall, and 20–4 in the Big East Conference, earning the conference championship.  They reached the College World Series for the second time in their history, where they finished 0–2, eliminated by Oregon State 11–4.

Roster

Coaches

Schedule

Ranking movements

References

Louisville Cardinals baseball seasons
Louisville
College World Series seasons
Big East Conference baseball champion seasons
2013 NCAA Division I baseball tournament participants
St Louis Cardinals